Judah Lavulo (born February 1, 1991) is an American rugby league footballer who represented United States national rugby league team in the 2013 World Cup.

Playing career
Lavulo is an American rugby league player for the Cabramatta Two Blues in the Ron Massey Cup and has previously played for Canterbury Bulldogs Under 20s. His position is at prop.

In 2013, Lavulo was named in the United States squad for the World Cup and was involved in their 22–18 win over France.

References

External links
 

1991 births
American rugby league players
United States national rugby league team players
Cabramatta Two Blues players
Rugby league props
Living people